Elaphrus tuberculatus is a species of ground beetle in the subfamily Elaphrinae. It was described by Maklin in 1878.

References

Elaphrinae
Beetles described in 1878